The music of Dance Dance Revolution is the collective soundtracks of the initial 
Dance Dance Revolution game in Konami's music simulation series. The soundtracks rely heavily on licensed music from Toshiba EMI's Dancemania series and also contain original songs produced by Konami's in-house artist Naoki Maeda. The original arcade game contains 11 tracks. Due to the staggered release of the game in other regions additional songs from newer releases in the series appear in the Asian, American and European releases.

List of tracks

Across, releases are listed in chronological order. Down, tracks are listed by in-game sort order then by chronological release.

Tracks
This is a list of the tracks featured as music in Dance Dance Revolution. For a list of the tracks that originally appeared in Dance Dance Revolution 2ndMix see the music of Dance Dance Revolution 2ndMix.

Butterfly

"Butterfly" is a song by Smile.dk.

Have You Never Been Mellow
"Have You Never Been Mellow" is a song by The Olivia Project.

Kung Fu Fighting
A version of "Kung Fu Fighting" by Bus Stop featuring Carl Douglas.

Let's Get Down
"Let's Get Down" is a song by JT Playaz. It takes the music for its refrain from the song "Celebration" by Kool & the Gang.

Little Bitch
"Little Bitch" is a song by The Specials, featured on their 1979 self-titled album.

Make It Better
"Make It Better" is a song by Mitsu-O!. It is noted for its similarities to the song "Money" by Ragga Twins, a song which is in the data of the game but left unused.

My Fire
"My Fire" is a song by X-Treme.

Paranoia
"Paranoia" is a song by 180. In the original release of Dance Dance Revolution, this was the only Konami Original song.

Strictly Business

"Strictly Business" is a song by Mantronik vs EPMD.

That's The Way (I Like It)

"That's The Way (I Like It)" is a song by KC & The Sunshine Band.

Trip Machine
"Trip Machine" is a song by De-Sire.

See also
List of Dance Dance Revolution songs
Music of Dance Dance Revolution 2ndMix

References

External links
 

Dance Dance Revolution